Pyrgus warrenensis, the Warren's skipper, is a species of skipper (family Hesperiidae). It is a strictly Alpine species.

This is a small skipper (wingspan 18–24 mm) with tiny white markings on dark brown wings. Very little is known about the ecology of this species and the larval food plant is unknown.

References

Whalley, Paul - Mitchell Beazley Guide to Butterflies (1981, reprinted 1992)

External links
Lepiforum.de

Pyrgus
Butterflies described in 1928
Butterflies of Europe
Taxa named by Ruggero Verity